{{DISPLAYTITLE:C30H18}}
The molecular formula C30H18 (molar mass: 378.46 g/mol, exact mass: 378.1409 u) may refer to:

 9,10-Bis(phenylethynyl)anthracene (BPEA)
 Heptacene
 Trinaphthylene

Molecular formulas